Nicholas Orme (born 1942) is a British historian specialising in the Middle Ages and Tudor period, focusing on the history of children, and ecclesiastical history, with a particular interest in South West England.

Orme is an Emeritus Professor of History at Exeter University. He studied at Magdalen College, Oxford, and has worked as a visiting scholar at, among others, Merton College, Oxford, St John's College, Oxford, and the University of Arizona. He retired on 31 May 2007. and is a canon of the Church of England.

His 2021 book, Going to Church in Medieval England, was shortlisted for the 2022 Wolfson History Prize.

Selected works
 (1973) English Schools in the Middle Ages, Routledge, 
 (1976) Education in the West of England, 1066–1548, University of Exeter Press, 
 (1980) The Minor Clergy of Exeter Cathedral: 1300–1548 – a list of the minor officers, vicars choral, annuellars, secondaries and choristers. University of Exeter Press 
 (1983) Early British Swimming, 55 B.C.–1719 A.D: with the first swimming treatise in English, 1595. University of Exeter Press 
 (1984) From Childhood to Chivalry: Education of the English Kings and Aristocracy, Routledge, 
 (1987) Exeter Cathedral as It Was, 1050–1550, Devon Books 
 (1988) Education in Early Tudor England: Magdalen College Oxford and Its School, 1480–1540, Magdalen College
 (1989) Education and Society in Mediaeval and Renaissance England, Hambledon Continuum, 
 (1989) Table Manners for Children, by John Lydgate ; with translation and introduction by Nicholas Orme  
 (1991) Unity and Variety: a History of the Church in Devon and Cornwall 
 (1996) English Church Dedications: With a Survey of Cornwall and Devon, University of Exeter Press 
 (2000) The Saints of Cornwall, Oxford University Press, 
 (2001) Medieval Children, New Haven: Yale University Press 
 (2006) Medieval Schools: From Roman Britain to Tudor England, New Haven: Yale University Press, 
 (2006) 'School founders and patrons in England, 597–1560' in Oxford Dictionary of National Biography
 (2007) Cornwall and the Cross. Chichester: Phillimore
 (2007) The Victoria History of the County of Cornwall: Religious History to 1559 v. 2, 
 (2009) Exeter Cathedral: The First Thousand Years, c. 400–1550, Impress Books, .
 (2014) The Churches of Medieval Exeter, Impress Books, .
 (2021) Going to Church in Medieval England, Yale University Press,

Works as editor or collaborator
 Nicholas Roscarrock's Lives of the Saints (1992) 
 With Margaret Webster: (1995) The English Hospital, 1070–1570, Yale University Press, 
 With David Lepine: (2003) Death and Memory in Medieval Exeter, Devon & Cornwall Record Society, 

For a more extensive list of Professor Orme's publications, see School of Humanities and Social Sciences of the University of Exeter Website and the University Library Catalogue

References

Living people
British historians
British medievalists
Academics of the University of Exeter
Alumni of Magdalen College, Oxford
University of Arizona faculty
Scholars of childhood
Corresponding Fellows of the Medieval Academy of America
1942 births